Yuri Mraqqadi (born 17 December 1969) is a Lebanese singer of Armenian descent. He studied production and became a professional advertising designer in addition to music.

Career
He became famous after his hit single "Arabiyyon ana" which jump-started his musical career. His follow-up song "Al-Mar'a al-Arabiyyah" had a similar pan-Arab success. Between 2001 and 2005, Mraqqadi released four studio albums. After a period of hiatus, he has returned for new materials of his own composition starting 2011, and is preparing a new album.

Mraqqadi co-starred with the Egyptian actress Hanan Tork in the film Al Hayah Montaha Al Lazzah in 2005. In 2018, he had the main role in the soap opera, Majnoune Fiki.

Personal life
Mraqqadi married Olfat Munther, a beauty expert and presenter, in 2012. He moved to Canada with his family and returned in 2015, after a nine-year break from music work.

Discography

Albums 
Source:
2001: Arabiyyon ana
2003: Habs el Nisaa
2004: Bahebk Moot
2005: Ya Aasi

Videography
"Shiftee Wsiltee"
"Bahibbak Mot"
"Hada Mosh Ana"
"Ansak"
"Arabiyyon Ana"
"Maza Aqool"
"Khateera Antee"
"Al-Mar'a al-Arabiyyah"
"Allimeeni"

References

1969 births
Living people
Lebanese people of Armenian descent
21st-century Lebanese male singers
Singers who perform in Classical Arabic